John P. Moore is an American virologist and professor at Cornell University's Weill Cornell Medicine college, known for his research on HIV/AIDS. He previously worked at the Aaron Diamond AIDS Research Center. A former section editor of the Journal of General Virology, he is an outspoken critic of HIV/AIDS denialism, including the work of Peter Duesberg.

References

External links
Faculty page

HIV/AIDS researchers
Living people
Cornell University faculty
American virologists
Year of birth missing (living people)
Scientific American people